Fuoriclasse ("A League of Their Own", also being a pun on words with "Out of Class") is an Italian TV series set in a high school, directed by Riccardo Donna and starring Luciana Littizzetto. It is loosely based on the books by Domenico Starnone. The synopsis of the series is similar to the story of the film La scuola (1995), also scripted by Starnone.

Plot and themes
The plot centers on a high school in Turin, the Liceo Scientifico Caravaggio, and particularly on a freshman class and a senior class. Most teachers in the show are seen as very human and not just condemning of the students who do not study enough, while some of them are the usual strict or heartless teachers. The leading character of the series is Isa Passamaglia (portrayed by Littizzetto), a teacher of Latin and Italian at the Caravaggio High and a single mother of a teenager son, who constantly bears a grudge at her. The show also deals with the personal hardships faced by Passamaglia's colleagues as well as by her students.

The series proved to be a huge success in Italy for the realistic depiction of the issues Italian students and teaching staff often face. At a certain point in the plot, it is even feared that the high school may face closure due to a lack of public fundings, a plausible scenario in the years of the economic crisis. Rivalry between teachers and misunderstandings between them and the school headmaster are also heavily featured in the series. Further themes are explored, including blended families, late pregnancy, juggling family life and job life, sexual orientation, child-parent relationship, first love, and more.

External links
 

2011 Italian television series debuts
2010s high school television series
RAI original programming